Sheffield Hallam University F.C. is an English association football club based in Sheffield, South Yorkshire. The club is  affiliated to the Sheffield & Hallamshire County Football Association

History

League and cup history

References

Football clubs in South Yorkshire
Sports teams and clubs in Sheffield
University and college football clubs in England
Yorkshire Football League
Football clubs in England